Liasos Louka (born 1 February 1980) is a Cypriot football manager and former player. He is the current manager of AEZ Zakakiou.

Louka started his career at Nea Salamina. He has also played for PAOK, AEL Limassol, AEP Paphos, AEK Kouklia before finishing his career at Karmiotissa, where he was a player-manager.

Honours

Player 
Nea Salamina
Cypriot Second Division (1) : 2001–02

Karmiotissa Polemidion
 Cypriot Second Division B2: 1
2013-14

External links
 

1980 births
Living people
Association football midfielders
Cypriot footballers
Cyprus under-21 international footballers
AEL Limassol players
PAOK FC players
Nea Salamis Famagusta FC players
AEP Paphos FC players
AEK Kouklia F.C. players
Cypriot First Division players
Super League Greece players
Cypriot expatriate footballers
Expatriate footballers in Greece
Cypriot football managers
Karmiotissa FC managers
Karmiotissa FC players
Nea Salamis Famagusta FC managers